Lusciano is a comune in the province of Caserta in Campania, Italy. Between 1929 and 1946, it was part of the comune of Aversa.

Neighbouring communes
Aversa
Trentola-Ducenta
Parete
Giugliano in Campania

References

Cities and towns in Campania